Stanislav Tarasenko (born July 23, 1966 in Zhukov, Rostov-na-Donu) is a retired long jumper from Russia, best known for winning the silver medal in the men's long jump event at the 1993 World Championships in Stuttgart, Germany.

References

1966 births
Living people
Sportspeople from Rostov-on-Don
Russian male long jumpers
World Athletics Championships medalists
Russian Athletics Championships winners